Halifax County is a county located in the U.S. state of North Carolina. As of the 2020 census, the population was 48,622. Its county seat is Halifax.

Halifax County is part of the Roanoke Rapids, NC Micropolitan Statistical Area, which is also included in the Rocky Mount-Wilson-Roanoke Rapids, NC Combined Statistical Area.

History
Halifax County is located in North Carolina's Coastal Plain region. The geography and history of the county were shaped by the Roanoke River, which forms its northern boundary. According to Preservation North Carolina, “Halifax County, designated in 1759, is one of the oldest counties in North Carolina with a rich history dating back to the earliest days of European settlement of North America. Over the years, Halifax County has provided North Carolina with more leaders – governors, congressmen, generals – than any other county in the state.”

Originally the area was home to Tuscarora Indians and then it was settled in the early 18th century by English colonists migrating south from Virginia and also from New Jersey. The town of Halifax developed along the banks of the Roanoke River and established itself as the trading center for goods passing from settlement to settlement. The Roanoke River played a major role in the county's development, so much so that Halifax County was even considered as a potential capital of North Carolina. It remained a prosperous county until the railroads usurped the river as the major form of transportation. After Halifax County separated from Edgecombe County, the town of Halifax became the county seat (Enfield was the original county seat when Halifax was part of Edgecombe County). All territory within the boundaries of Edgecombe County north of Fishing Creek and Rainbow Banks on the Roanoke River (approximately 711 square miles) was officially designated as Halifax County on January 1, 1759. The current Halifax County towns include Enfield, Hobgood, Littleton, Roanoke Rapids, Scotland Neck, and Weldon.

Besides having 40 sites on the National Register of Historic Places, Halifax County is also historically significant because of two events preceding the American Revolution. John Lord Carteret, the second Earl Granville, inherited a one-eighth share of Carolina territory originally granted to Sir George Carteret by the British Crown. The second Earl Granville administered the district (an area between the present Virginia-North Carolina border and a line about 65 miles south) from across the Atlantic,  but there was little oversight and the land agents he put in charge of granting land, collecting rent and surveying for settlers – Edward Moseley, Francis Corbin and Thomas Child – were often accused of malfeasance by settlers and landowners.

On January 24, 1759, a group of men from Halifax and Edgecombe counties rode to Francis Corbin's house in Edenton and seized him during the night. The men were upset because Corbin had extorted money from them when collecting rents for Lord Granville who controlled the land on which they lived. Corbin was taken to Enfield, along with a co-conspirator Thomas Bodley – and the men were kept in jail for four days – until they agreed to acknowledge the corruption and set records straight. Enfield was the seat of the judicial district, including Northampton, Granville, and Edgecombe County, before Halifax became the county seat.

Although Corbin was eventually relieved of his duties by Lord Granville, a few months later a court accused the Halifax and Edgecombe men of kidnapping. The kidnappers were imprisoned in the Enfield jail and a second “riot” erupted on May 14, 1759, when a mob broke into the jail and freed the men who had kidnapped Corbin and Bodley. Distrust of the British Crown and the rule of royal governors continued to foment unrest in eastern North Carolina until the colony became the first of its peers to recommend American independence.

On April 12, 1776, the North Carolina Provincial Congress met in Halifax and passed a resolution known as the Halifax Resolves. The first resolution of its kind, the document instructed North Carolina's delegates to the Second Continental Congress in Philadelphia to vote for independence from Great Britain. The date of the Halifax Resolves is commemorated on the state's flag. Each year April 12 is celebrated as Halifax Day, with individuals in period costumes demonstrating colonial-era activities and craftsmanship.

Geography

Some of Halifax County's natural attractions include Medoc Mountain State Park, Lake Gaston, and Roanoke Rapids Lake. Sylvan Bird Park in Scotland Neck is home to the world's largest collection of waterfowl. According to a North Carolina Deer Hunting 2016 -2017 study, Halifax County had the most number of harvested whitetail deer.

The Lakeland Arts Center, the Canal Arts Center, and the Roanoke Valley Players theater group are a few of the county's cultural institutions. With 328 seats and an 11-piece orchestra pit, Lakeland Theatre Company in Littleton marks several decades of showcasing plays and concerts. The Enfield Performing Arts Center had its first film festival in October 2017, featuring the work of local and nationally known film makers.

With 195,896 acres in farmland, Halifax County agricultural products include tobacco, peanuts, cotton, corn, soybeans. In addition, Halifax County sits in the heart of the great southern wood basket. The southern forests produce 12 percent of the world's wood product and 19 percent of its pulp and paper.

State and local protected areas/sites 
 Historic Halifax
 Lake Gaston Day Use Area (part)
 Medoc Mountain State Park
 Roanoke Rapids Lake Day Use Area (part)
 Tillery Game Land (part)

Major water bodies 
 Bear Swamp
 Beaverdam Swamp
 Deep Creek
 Fishing Creek
 Indian Branch
 Lake Gaston
 Little Quankey Swamp
 Marsh Swamp
 Martin Swamp
 Quankey Swamp
 Roanoke Rapids Lake
 Roanoke River
 Rocky Swamp

Adjacent counties
 Northampton County - north-northeast
 Bertie County - east
 Martin County - southeast
 Edgecombe County - south
 Nash County - south
 Franklin County - southwest
 Warren County - west

Major highways

Major infrastructure 
 Halifax-Northampton Regional Airport

Demographics

2020 census

As of the 2020 United States census, there were 48,622 people, 21,017 households, and 13,680 families residing in the county.

2010 census
As of the 2010 United States Census, there were 54,691 people living in the county. 53.2% were Black or African American, 40.0% White, 3.8% Native American, 0.7% Asian, 1.1% of some other race and 1.2% of two or more races. 2.1% were Hispanic or Latino (of any race).

2000 census
As of the census of 2000, there were 57,370 people, 22,122 households, and 15,308 families living in the county.  The population density was 79 people per square mile (31/km2).  There were 25,309 housing units at an average density of 35 per square mile (13/km2).  The racial makeup of the county was 52.56% Black or African American, 42.57% White, 3.14% Native American, 0.54% Asian, 0.02% Pacific Islander, 0.47% from other races, and 0.71% from two or more races.  1.01% of the population were Hispanic or Latino of any race.

There were 22,122 households, out of which 31.20% had children under the age of 18 living with them, 44.10% were married couples living together, 20.40% had a female householder with no husband present, and 30.80% were non-families. 27.70% of all households were made up of individuals, and 12.00% had someone living alone who was 65 years of age or older.  The average household size was 2.51 and the average family size was 3.06.

In the county, the population was spread out, with 26.20% under the age of 18, 8.00% from 18 to 24, 27.70% from 25 to 44, 23.20% from 45 to 64, and 14.90% who were 65 years of age or older.  The median age was 37 years. For every 100 females there were 90.70 males.  For every 100 females age 18 and over, there were 86.00 males.

The median income for a household in the county was $26,459, and the median income for a family was $33,515. Males had a median income of $28,025 versus $20,524 for females. The per capita income for the county was $13,810.  About 19.40% of families and 26.1% of the population were below the poverty line, including 33.00% of those under age 18 and 22.40% of those age 65 or over.

Government and politics
Halifax County is a member of the regional Upper Coastal Plain Council of Governments. With its large African American population, Halifax County has long been a Democratic stronghold. The last Republican to carry the county in a presidential election was Richard Nixon in 1972. 

Halifax County is part of North Carolina's 1st Congressional District in the United States House of Representatives, represented by Democrat Don Davis.

Halifax County is represented by Michael H. Wray in the 27th district in the North Carolina House of Representatives.

Communities

City
 Roanoke Rapids (largest city)

Towns
 Enfield
 Halifax (county seat)
 Hobgood
 Littleton
 Scotland Neck
 Weldon

Census-designated places
 Hollister
 South Rosemary
 South Weldon

Unincorporated communities
 Aurelian Springs
 Brinkleyville
 Charleston
 Essex
 Heathsville

Townships

 Brinkleyville
 Butterwood
 Conoconnara
 Enfield
 Faucett
 Halifax
 Hobgood
 Littleton
 Palmyra
 Roanoke Rapids
 Roseneath
 Scotland Neck
 Weldon

Notable people 

 Willis Alston – U.S. Congress
 John R. Bryant – N.C. Senate
 Walter Clark (judge) –chief justice, N.C. Supreme Court
 John Crowell – politician
 Joseph J. Daniel – justice, N.C. Supreme Court
 John Eaton  – diplomat, U.S. Senator, U.S. Secretary of War 
 Henry Eppes –N.C. Senate
 W. T. J. Hayes – politician
 Isaac H. Hilliard – planter and cotton factor
 James Hogun – general in the Continental Army during the American Revolutionary War
 William H. Kitchin – U.S. Congressman
 James Robert McLean – Confederate politician and soldier
 William Rabun – Governor of Georgia
 John Sitgreaves – U.S. District Court judge
 Maurice Smith  – former professional football player
 Starling Tucker – politician in South Carolina
 Mary Welch – Broadway actress
 Tom Winslow – folk singer and writer

See also
 List of counties in North Carolina
 National Register of Historic Places listings in Halifax County, North Carolina
 North Carolina State Parks
 Haliwa-Saponi, state-recognized tribe that resides in the county

References

External links

 
 
 Roanoke Rapids NC based County Visitor Center
 NCGenWeb Halifax County - free genealogy resources for the county

 
1758 establishments in North Carolina
Roanoke Rapids, North Carolina micropolitan area
Populated places established in 1758
Black Belt (U.S. region)
Majority-minority counties in North Carolina